Ischnocoris is a genus of true bugs belonging to the family Rhyparochromidae.

The species of this genus are found in Europe.

Species:
 Ischnocoris angustulus (Boheman, 1852)
 Ischnocoris bureschi Josifov, 1976

References

Drymini
Hemiptera genera